Israel has participated in the Eurovision Song Contest 44 times since making its debut in . Israel was able to enter the contest as the Israel Broadcasting Authority (IBA) was an active member of the European Broadcasting Union (EBU), which was responsible for the event. The IBA was succeeded as the broadcaster in charge of the Israeli entry by the Israeli Public Broadcasting Corporation (IPBC/Kan) in 2018.

Israel's first appearance at the contest in 1973 was successful, with Ilanit finishing fourth. Israel then achieved victories in 1978 and 1979, with wins for Izhar Cohen and the Alphabeta with the song "A-Ba-Ni-Bi", and Milk and Honey with "Hallelujah". In , the IBA declined to host the contest for the second successive year for financial reasons, and as the date for the contest in The Hague conflicted with Yom HaZikaron – Israeli Memorial Day – Israel did not participate. This is the only time that the winning country did not compete the following year.

Since the introduction of the semi-finals in 2004, Israel has failed to reach the final six times. In , Shiri Maimon gave the country its tenth top five result, finishing fourth.

History

Victories
To date there have been four Israeli victories in the contest. On home ground in Jerusalem , Israel won again, this time with "Hallelujah" performed by Milk and Honey.

Other performances
Israel's earliest selections were picked by the Israel Broadcasting Authority (IBA). While considering the proposal, the duo noticed that Israel was eligible to participate and approached the IBA with a proposal that Ilanit would represent Israel. However, by the time the IBA contacted the EBU, the registration period was over and instead Ilanit was promised to represent Israel in 1973. Criticism increased after she was sent again four years later, leading to a rule that the winner of the already established Hebrew Song and Chorus Festival would also represent Israel at the contest. The 1978 and 1979 Israeli Eurovision winners were selected by this method. From 1981, the selection process took place via the Kdam Eurovision with the exceptions of 1990, 1998, 1999, 2000, 2002–2004, 2006–2007 and 2010 where the IBA selected their representatives internally.

After winning the contest in 1978 and 1979, the IBA was financially and logistically unable to organise the event for the second consecutive year, resulting in the Netherlands stepping up to host the 1980 contest in their place. The date chosen for that year's contest coincided with Yom HaZikaron, the Israeli Memorial Day, and the country was thus forced to withdraw. This made Israel the only country to date unable to defend its title. The 1980 Hebrew Song and Chorus Festival therefore did not double as a national final that year unlike the last two years, and the winning song "Pizmon Chozer" by the band The Brothers & the Sisters was never given the chance to participate in the Eurovision Song Contest. In 1984, Israel once again refrained from participating due to the same date conflict.

Apart from its victories, Israel's entries have had a mixed reception at the contest. Avi Toledano and Ofra Haza scored well with big revivalist numbers, but the all-singing, all-dancing style became less popular later in the decade and Israel's  entry, "Yavo Yom" by Moti Giladi and Sarai Tzuriel, came in 19th, the country's worst showing yet at the time.

In , Israel finished 8th with "Shir Habatlanim" by the satiric duo Lazy Bums. Due to its satirical nature, it prompted then-Israeli Minister of Culture, Yitzhak Navon, to threaten to resign if the song went on to represent Israel at the contest; this ultimately did not occur.

Ping-Pong's disco effort in  failed, though the group was noted for their largely optimistic lyrics and message of reconciliation and peace in Western Asia. They went as far as waving Syrian flags at the end of their performance, angering some Israelis.

In , David D'Or came 11th in the semi-final with the song "", leaving Israel out of the final for the first time since 1997. Shiri Maimon with "" in  brought Israel back to the top five, and ensured Israel a place in the  final, where it was represented by singer Eddie Butler, who had finished 5th as part of Eden in 1999; however, his performance of the song "Together We Are One" finished 23rd, with only four points.

IBA's Eurovision committee chose the band Teapacks to represent Israel in the  contest. Their humorous entry "Push the Button" did not fare well, finishing in 24th place out of a semi-final field of 28 and failing to reach the final. In , an Arab citizen of Israel represented the country for the first time, as Mira Awad performed "There Must Be Another Way" alongside Jewish-Israeli singer Noa in Moscow. Israel was represented in 2010 by Harel Skaat, who came 14th in the final with "Milim".

Israel's participations from 2011 to 2014 were less successful, as former Eurovision winner Dana International in Düsseldorf, the band Izabo in Baku, Moran Mazor in Malmö and Mei Finegold in Copenhagen, all failed to qualify for the final. In 2015, Nadav Guedj brought Israel back to the final with "Golden Boy", the first Israeli entry without a Hebrew lyric. Prior to their fourth win, they also managed to qualify in 2016 with Hovi Star and "Made of Stars" (which finished 14th) and in 2017 with Imri Ziv and "I Feel Alive" (which finished 23rd, Israel's lowest placing in a Eurovision final since 2006). In 2019 as host country with Kobi Marimi and his song "Home", Israel was pre-qualified for the final, however, they eventually finished in 23rd place, making it the fourth time since 2015 that the host country ranked in the bottom five.

In early 2020, it was announced that the 2020 season of HaKokhav HaBa would be the last time it would be used to select the Israeli entrant, with a separate national final to select the winning artist's Eurovision entry. Eden Alene, selected via HaKokhav HaBa in 2020 – with the entry "Feker Libi" chosen via a separate national final – was selected to represent Israel again in 2021 following the cancellation of the 2020 contest, and a new national final was held to select her entry for 2021, which was later revealed to be "Set Me Free". The song went on to finish in 17th place in the final, and notably includes a B6 whistle note, the highest note in the history of the contest.

For the 2022 contest, the fourth season of The X Factor Israel was used to determine the 2022 entry, later revealed to be Michael Ben David with "I.M". The song failed to qualify for the final, marking the first time that Israel missed out on a final since 2014. For the 2023 contest, an internal selection was used to determine the entry, later revealed to be Noa Kirel with "Unicorn".

Participation overview

Congratulations: 50 Years of the Eurovision Song Contest

Hostings

Awards

Marcel Bezençon Awards

Winner by OGAE members

Related involvement

Conductors

Heads of delegation

Commentators and spokespersons
Until 2018, Israel only had a television commentator once, in 1979. In most cases, they opted instead to simply broadcast the transmission without commentary and with Hebrew subtitles. Beginning in 2013 and lasting until 2017, they also aired the contest with Arabic subtitles on IBA Channel 33. 1980 was the only year that was not broadcast either on television or radio due to Yom HaZikaron; in both 1984 and 1997, which Israel also had to miss due to the holiday, the IBA aired the show on delay, and there was no radio broadcast. They also typically provided radio commentary beginning in the early '80s, unless they weren't participating that year (excepting 2000). They had no commentary of either sort until 2013, when they resumed radio broadcasting, and 2018, when they had their first television commentators since 1979. The Israeli transmission was also shown worldwide via the Israeli Network between 2003 and 2004.

Costume designers

Gallery

Arab reaction to Israeli participation 
In 1978, during the performance of the Israeli entry, the Jordanian broadcaster JRTV suspended the broadcast, and instead showed pictures of flowers. When it became apparent during the later stages of the voting sequence that Israel was going to win the contest, JRTV abruptly ended the transmission. Afterwards, the Jordanian news media refused to acknowledge the fact that Israel had won, and announced that the winner was Belgium (which had actually come in second). By coincidence, Israel did not broadcast the victory either, as the IBA did not buy enough broadcasting time. The victory was broadcast the next day.

At the time, Israeli Television was in its infancy and broadcasting in black & white. Many/most Israelis therefore watched international events in colour, using the signal from neighbouring Jordan. As Jordan did not broadcast the Israeli entry and the IBA did not broadcast the results part of the event, the win only became known as a result of radio broadcasts.

Because of Israel's participation in the Eurovision Song Contest, many Arab states that are eligible to participate do not do so. Tunisia, Morocco, and Lebanon are cases in point. Tunisia intended participation in 1977, but decided not to do so in the end; Lebanon also intended to participate in 2005 when it withdrew (incurring a fine by the EBU) because Lebanese law does not allow recognition of Israel, and consequently Lebanese television would not transmit any Israeli material – which would have been a violation of the EBU's rules.

See also
Music of Israel

Notes

References

 
Countries in the Eurovision Song Contest